George James Wardle CH (15 May 1865 – 18 June 1947) was a British politician.

Biography
He was born on 15 May 1865.

He was editor of the Railway Review and, in 1906, was elected a Labour Member of Parliament for Stockport. At the 1916 Labour Party conference, he made a speech which resulted in the conference passing resolutions as to the party stand on World War I, something the party leader Ramsay MacDonald had failed to establish. He was a founding member of the Order of the Companions of Honour in 1917, and between 1917 and 1919 he served as Parliamentary Secretary to the Board of Trade. In the 1918 General Election he successfully stood for election as a Coalition Labour candidate.  He resigned as a Member of Parliament on 9 March 1920 by becoming Steward of the Chiltern Hundreds.

He died on 18 June 1947.

References

External links 
 

1865 births
1947 deaths
Amalgamated Society of Railway Servants-sponsored MPs
Labour Party (UK) MPs for English constituencies
UK MPs 1906–1910
UK MPs 1910
UK MPs 1910–1918
UK MPs 1918–1922
Members of the Order of the Companions of Honour
Coalition Labour MPs
Chairs of the Labour Party (UK)
Parliamentary Secretaries to the Board of Trade
Members of the Parliament of the United Kingdom for Stockport